Thiago Trindade de Moura (born 18 February 1989), commonly known as Thiago Trindade, is a Brazilian footballer who currently plays as a forward for Kajaani.

Career statistics

Club

Notes

References

1989 births
Living people
Brazilian footballers
Brazilian expatriate footballers
Association football forwards
Campinense Clube players
Quissamã Futebol Clube players
Clube Recreativo e Atlético Catalano players
Goytacaz Futebol Clube players
Clube Atlético Itapemirim players
Oulun Palloseura players
Ykkönen players
Brazilian expatriate sportspeople in Finland
Expatriate footballers in Finland
AC Kajaani players
Esporte Clube São João da Barra players
Sportspeople from Niterói